D. J. Jeffries (born December 28, 1999) is an American college basketball player for the Mississippi State Bulldogs of the Southeastern Conference (SEC). He previously played for the Memphis Tigers.

Early life and high school career
In third grade, Jeffries learned how to play basketball from his uncle at the local YMCA. He played the sport for Cordova Middle School in Memphis, Tennessee and stood 6'3 by seventh grade. Jeffries began dunking regularly by eighth grade. Jeffries played for Olive Branch High School in Olive Branch, Mississippi. As a junior, he averaged 20.8 points per game, leading his team to the Class 5A state title. He was named Clarion-Ledger Player of the Year as the top player in Mississippi. In his senior season, Jeffries averaged 23.3 points, 12.8 rebounds, 5.6 assists and 2.6 blocks per game, leading Olive Branch to a Class 5A state runner-up finish while being named Mississippi Gatorade Player of the Year. He was selected to play in the Jordan Brand Classic.

Recruiting
On March 12, 2018, Jeffries committed to play college basketball for Kentucky over offers from Alabama and Mississippi State, among others. He decommitted from Kentucky on July 30, becoming the first Kentucky decommit under coach John Calipari. Jeffries committed to Memphis on October 27. By the end of his high school career, he was considered a five-star recruit by ESPN and a four-star recruit by 247Sports and Rivals. Jeffries was the number one recruit from Mississippi in the 2019 class.

College career
Jeffries debuted for Memphis on November 5, 2019, recording five points, four rebounds, four assists and four blocks in a 97–64 win over South Carolina State. On November 23, he scored a freshman season-high 23 points to go with four rebounds in an 87–86 victory over the Ole Miss Rebels. Jeffries missed a January 4, 2020 game against Georgia with the flu. On January 20, 2020, he was named American Athletic Conference (AAC) Freshman of the Week, four days after scoring 18 points in a 60–49 win over Cincinnati. At practice on January 30, Jeffries partially tore his posterior cruciate ligament in his left knee and was expected to miss four to six weeks of action. On March 3, after missing nine games with the injury, he was ruled out for the remainder of the season. Jeffries started in 13 of his 19 games as a freshman, averaging 10.8 points and 4.3 rebounds per game. As a sophomore, he averaged 9.9 points and 5.1 rebounds per game, helping Memphis win the 2021 National Invitation Tournament. After the season, Jeffries transferred to Mississippi State.

Career statistics

College

|-
| style="text-align:left;"| 2019–20
| style="text-align:left;"| Memphis
| 19 || 13 || 27.1 || .513 || .390 || .743 || 4.3 || 1.5 || .7 || 1.1 || 10.8
|-
| style="text-align:left;"| 2020–21
| style="text-align:left;"| Memphis
| 28 || 11 || 25.6 || .443 || .352 || .562 || 5.1 || 1.9 || .9 || .9 || 9.9
|- class="sortbottom"
| style="text-align:center;" colspan="2"| Career
| 47 || 24 || 26.2 || .471 || .366 || .620 || 4.8 || 1.7 || .9 || 1.0 || 10.3

Personal life
Jeffries' cousins, Chandler, Dedric and K. J. Lawson, have played basketball at the collegiate or professional levels. He is the son of Shatonya and Corey Jeffries.

References

External links
Mississippi State Bulldogs bio
Memphis Tigers bio

Living people
1999 births
American men's basketball players
Memphis Tigers men's basketball players
Small forwards
People from Olive Branch, Mississippi
Basketball players from Mississippi
African-American basketball players
21st-century African-American sportspeople